Air India Express is an Indian low-cost airline headquartered in Kochi, Kerala. It is operated by Air India Express Limited, a wholly owned subsidiary of Indian flag carrier airline Air India. It operates around 649 flights per week to 33 destinations including the Middle East and Southeast Asia. The airline carries around 4.3 million passengers every year connecting 140 city pairs. It has secondary hubs in Thiruvananthapuram, Kannur, Tiruchirappalli,  
Kozhikode and Mangaluru.

History
Air India Express came into existence on 29 April 2005, with the launch of three flights that took off simultaneously from Thiruvananthapuram, Kochi and Kozhikode. The airline was launched as a low-cost carrier with the objective of providing convenient connectivity, to short-haul international routes, in the Middle East and Southeast Asia for the Indian expatriate community. Air India Express was Air India's response to the growing popularity of low-cost carriers worldwide and within the region. As a low-cost carrier, the airline operates point-to-point flights with multiple hubs all over India.

In December 2012, Air India ratified the proposal to move the headquarters to Kochi in January 2013 and to establish a new MRO base at Thiruvananthapuram.

Revenue
It is worth noting that the revenue growth was achieved despite the adverse market conditions due to the onset of COVID-19 during the last quarter of the fiscal.

The revenues increased by 14% recording a total revenue of  Average daily aircraft utilization rose to 12.2 hours from 11.3 hours. The capacity offered by the airline went up by 33%; the fleet size progressively increased from 17 to 23 aircraft; and the number of passengers carried increased by 22%, to 3.42 million from 2.8 million in 2015–16.

On 3 September 2016 the company announced that it had earned a net profit for the first time since its inception. In the fiscal year 2015–16, the airline witnessed a passenger load factor of 82.3% against 81.4% in the previous year, while average daily aircraft utilization rose to 11.3 hours from 10.8 hours. The airline carried around 2.80 million passengers against 2.62 million carried in the previous year.

Privatization
On 8 October 2021, Air India, along with its low-cost carrier Air India Express and fifty percent of AISATS, a ground handling company, were sold for ₹18,000 crores (US$2.5 billion) to Talace Private Limited, a Tata Sons' special-purpose entity. The airlines were later handed over to the Tata Group. In 2023, it was announced that Vistara will likely merge with Air India, Air India Express and AirAsia India by 2024, with AirAsia already under the Tatas, renamed as AIX Connect. The airlines are set to operate as Air India only.

Awards and recognition
Air India Express has been named the ‘Iconic Brand of India -2021’ by The Economic Times. The award was in recognition of its overall performance and efforts to ensure business continuity.

In 2021, Air India Express was adjudged as the 'Best Workplace for Women' by The Economic Times.

Destinations

Air India Express focuses on providing international flights from Tier II cities in India, to the Persian Gulf region and South East Asia. The airline flies to 33 destinations as of May 2019 with a primary hub located at Cochin International Airport in Kochi .

On the domestic front, the airline operates from the states of Kerala, Delhi, Andhra Pradesh, Tamil Nadu and Maharashtra. In its international arena, the airline mainly connects Indian cities with Persian Gulf countries and Singapore in the east.

Codeshare agreements
Air India

Fleet

, Air India Express operates the following aircraft:

Accidents and incidents
 On 22 May 2010, Air India Express Flight 812, a Boeing 737–800 (registered VT-AXV) flying on the Dubai–Mangalore route, overshot runway 24 on landing at Mangalore Airport, killing 152 passengers and six crew members of the 166 people on board. The aircraft crashed into a wooded valley at the end of the runway and burst into flames. There were only eight survivors.
 On 9 July 2012, an Air India Express Boeing 737-800 skidded on landing, during heavy rain at Calicut International Airport. Aircraft's landing gear impacted with runway beacons, breaking them. There were no casualties on board.
 On 12 October 2018, Air India Express Flight 611 was a UAE bound Boeing 737-800 (registered VT-AYD) that suffered a tail strike on take off, before colliding with the localizer antenna and boundary wall of Tiruchirappalli International Airport. This resulted in severe structural damage to the undercarriage, landing gear, flight control surfaces and engine cowling. The crew continued to fly towards Dubai contrary to Boeing's tail strike checklist, reassured by normal instrumentation. When the plane was nearing the Middle East, the pilot was ordered to fly to Mumbai, India. It landed uneventfully and was repaired at a substantial cost.
 On 7 August 2020, Air India Express Flight 1344, a Boeing 737–800 (registered VT-AXH), went into an uncontrolled skid on the runway due to heavy rain, fell into a valley and broke into three pieces after overrunning the table-top runway at Calicut International Airport. 21 people on board were killed, including both pilots, and at least 167 were injured.

See also
Air India Cargo
Air Kerala
Alliance Air (India)

References

External links

Air India
Airlines established in 2004
Low-cost carriers
Tata Group subsidiaries
2004 establishments in Kerala